Djeoromitxi or Jabutí (Yabuti) is a endangered Yabutian language that is spoken by only about fifty people (though including some children) in Rondônia, Brazil, at the headwaters of the Rio Branco.

Phonology
There is no tonal system in Djeoromitxí and accent is not contrastive. Morphophonological processes are rare. 

Syllable structure follows a (C)V pattern.

Consonants
The table below shows the consonant phonemes of Djeoromitxí according to Ribeiro and van der Voort (2010).

Although Pires (1992) counts /b/ /d/ as distinct phonemes, Ribeiro and van der Voort (2010) count them as allophones of /m/ /n/ before oral vowels.

According to Pires (1992), [] is an allophone of // before high and medium round vowels, and [] is an allophone of // following the high nasal vowel //.

While /ps/ and /bz/ only occur before /i/, they are contrastive with the other bilabial obstruents.

According to Ribeiro and van der Voort (2010), /k/ is backed to [q] before [ʉ] and often aspirated before /ə/ and /u/. They state that /p/ is realized as [ɸ] or [pɸ] before back vowels and [ʉ]. 

When preceded by a personal prefix, or when starting the second element of a compound, /h/ becomes /r/. With some roots, /h/ can become /n/ in a similar manner.

Vowels

The tables below show the vowel phonemes of Djeoromitxí according to Ribeiro and van der Voort (2010).

The accounts of Pires (1992) and Ribeiro and van der Voort (2010) basically agree on the vowel phonemes.

According to Pires (1992), [] is an allophone of // in free variation with [] after //.

Ribeiro and van der Voort (2010) state that /ʉ/ is often realized as [ø].

Grammar

Djeoromitxí has nouns, verbs, adverbs and particles, with adjectives treated as intransitive verbs. Its syntax is noun-modifier and SOV or OVS in order.

The following examples demonstrate noun-modifier and SOV word order.

Pronouns and person markers

The following table shows Djeoromitxí pronominal forms.

The use of the forms is illustrated in the following examples:

References

Citations

Works cited

External links
 Djeoromitxi basic lexicon at the Global Lexicostatistical Database

Yabutian languages
Mamoré–Guaporé linguistic area